The Gyrodyne RON Rotorcycle (originally designated HOG) was a tiny, single-seat helicopter designed under contract for the United States Navy. in the mid-1950s. It later was redesigned for a U.S. Marine Corps requirement for a small personal helicopter that would fulfill a number of roles, including observation, liaison, small unit tactical maneuvers, and which could be dropped to downed airmen behind enemy lines to facilitate their escape.

Development
Gyrodyne purchased the assets of Bendix Helicopters in 1949, including the Model 2C coaxial helicopter which provided the technology for the XRON-1. In 1951 the Model 2C was demonstrated to the Navy with shortcomings noted in autorotation control. The XRON-I was demonstrated under a new Navy contract NOas 55-388-c for a lightweight single man helicopter.

Design
Gyrodyne's design was an open-framework helicopter with coaxial rotors, which was evaluated with three different power plants (two reciprocating, one turbine).

The XRON-1 used a manually started 40 hp two-cycle engine with a gross weight capability of 500 lb. The fuselage is a simple box-beam construction. The rotor uses co-axial blades which alleviate the need for an anti-torque tail rotor. Yaw control is provided by rotor tip mounted "tip brakes" providing differential torque between the rotors. Gyrodyne patented the control on 24 October 1954 Patent No. 2,835,331. There is a small inverted V-tail for control at forward speeds. The rotors are laminated wood construction. The mast is pressure lubricated and becomes a cooling surface for oil inflight. The landing gear consists of three small wheels.

Operational history

The first flight was in November 1955. The two-cycle engine was prone to overheating and other engines were added to the program for testing. The Marine Corps also tested one XRON-1, and three YRON-1 prototypes.

The Marine Corps eventually concluded that both the RON, and the competing Hiller ROE were too heavy and too difficult to fly and abandoned the project. The United States Navy, however, had noticed the compact size and high load-carrying capacity of the RON, and in 1960 awarded a contract to Gyrodyne to produce a radio-controlled drone version of the Rotorcycle, to be used as an Anti-Submarine Warfare platform. Using the dynamic components of the RON, this was eventually developed as the Gyrodyne QH-50.

The Rotorcycle went on to win the prize for most maneuverable helicopter at the Paris Air Show in 1961, and was selected for a 1964 trade fair in Morocco by the United States Department of Commerce.

A two-place enclosed "gyrocycle" commercial variant was proposed after initial tests.

Variants

XRON-1Prototype
YRON-1
 Powered by a  4-stroke Porsche YO-95-2 model Model GP-702/1 600cc variant with  diameter rotors.   
 Powered by a  Solar YT62 turbine model with  diameter rotors.   
 Powered by a  Solar T62 gas turbine engine and  diameter rotors.
 Powered by a  4-stroke Porsche YO-95-8 DSN-1/QH-50A engine. 
 Powered by a  Electric Engine with 50 Min endurance.

On display
The Cradle of Aviation Museum in New York has a XRON-1 on display 

The New England Air Museum, Windsor Locks, CT.

Specifications

See also

References

Citations

Bibliography

Further reading
 
 

RON
1950s United States military utility aircraft
1950s United States helicopters
Single-engined piston helicopters
Coaxial rotor helicopters
Aircraft first flown in 1955